Don Hammond (24 August 1922 – 16 July 2005) was an Australian rules footballer who played with Fitzroy in the Victorian Football League (VFL).

Notes

External links 
		

1922 births
2005 deaths
Australian rules footballers from Victoria (Australia)
Fitzroy Football Club players